Orji Nelson Chukwuma (born 5 April 2002) is a Nigerian footballer who plays as an defender for USL Championship side Atlanta United 2.

Club career 
Orji joined the FC Porto under-19 team after playing for the Super Star Football Academy in Nigeria. In early 2021, Orji was sent on loan to Hungarian Nemzeti Bajnokság I side Zalaegerszegi. His only appearance for the side was in the Magyar Kupa.

On 2 March 2022, Orji signed with USL Championship club Atlanta United 2. He debuted for Atlanta on 9 April 2022, appearing as a 64th–minute substitute during a 4–0 loss to Detroit City FC.

References

External links
 

2002 births
Living people
Association football defenders
Atlanta United 2 players
Expatriate footballers in Hungary
Expatriate footballers in Portugal
Expatriate soccer players in the United States
Nigerian expatriate footballers
Nigerian expatriate sportspeople in Hungary
Nigerian expatriate sportspeople in Portugal
Nigerian expatriate sportspeople in the United States
Nigerian footballers
FC Porto players
USL Championship players
Zalaegerszegi TE players